Stenocercus caducus is a species of lizard of the Tropiduridae family. It is found in Bolivia, Brazil, Paraguay, and Argentina.

References

Stenocercus
Reptiles described in 1862
Taxa named by Edward Drinker Cope